Goniurellia tridens is a species of tephritid or fruit flies in the genus Goniurellia of the family Tephritidae.
Each wing of a Goniurellia tridens fly is transparent and bears a “precisely detailed image of an ant-like insect”.

Distribution
Palestine, Saudi Arabia, Turkmenistan, Uzbekistan, Iran, Pakistan, India, Canary Islands.

References

Tephritinae
Insects described in 1910
Diptera of Asia